The Lord of the Rings: The Return of the King  is the soundtrack for the 2003 epic fantasy adventure film of the same name. The score was composed, orchestrated, and conducted by Howard Shore, and performed by the London Philharmonic Orchestra, the London Voices, and the London Oratory School Schola. The soundtrack was released on 25 November 2003. The limited edition contains a bonus DVD with the track "Use Well the Days" by Annie Lennox, song texts, photo gallery, and a Lord of the Rings trilogy supertrailer.

Overview 

The score to Return of the King is the most expansive of the three soundtracks to Peter Jackson's film trilogy. It contains over four hours of finalized music, scoring virtually the entire film length. It also musters the biggest staged forces, with sections calling for eight trumpets and a similar increase in the rest of the brass section, two timpanists, a mixed choir of 85 with additional singers for all-male and all-female parts, over fifty in the boy choir, various vocal soloists including the American soprano Renee Fleming and the boy soprano Ben Del Maestro, and the full bands of celtic and eastern instruments returning from the first score. The score even uses a double fiddle, an instrument invented and crafted specifically for one scene in the film. Shore also scored the trailer for the film, which would eventually be released with various alternate takes in the Rarities archive.

Reception 

The Return of the King won the Academy Awards for Best Original Score and Best Original Song ("Into the West" by Annie Lennox), the Golden Globe Award for Best Original Score, and the Grammy Award for Best Score Soundtrack Album.

Track listing

Charts and certifications

Weekly charts

Year-end charts

Certifications

Complete recordings and additional music
In 2006, Reprise Records released a multi-disc set for the film, titled The Complete Recordings. These contain the entire score for the extended versions of the film on CD, along with an additional DVD-Audio disc that offers 2.0 stereo and 5.1 surround mixes of the soundtrack. The album also featured extensive liner notes by music journalist Doug Adams which reviews all of the tracks and provides information about the process of composing and recording the score, as well as a detailed list of all musical instruments, people and organizations involved. The cover artwork uses the film series' logo and an inscription in Tolkien's tengwar letters, over a background that depicts a map of Gondor in dark green.

Additional music 
Additional music for the film was featured in The Rarities Archive release, attached to Doug Adams' book on the three film scores:Along with about 17 minutes of alternate material from the original release, about a minute of material in the fan credits, and some additional alternates, there are over four and a half hours of finalized music for Return of the King, including the music for the trailer.

References 

2003 soundtrack albums
2000s film soundtrack albums
Classical music soundtracks
The Lord of the Rings (film series) music
Howard Shore soundtracks
Reprise Records soundtracks